Jim Clemes (born 1957) is a Luxembourg architect who founded the Esch-sur-Alzette firm Atelier d’Architecture et de Design Jim Clemes in 1984. He and his firm have designed several modern Luxembourg buildings and are also involved in town planning initiatives.

Biography

Born on 29 July 1957 in Luxembourg City, Clemes attended the Lycée des Garçons in Esch-sur-Alzette. He graduated in environmental design at Miami University, Oxford, Ohio and in architecture at the École Spéciale d'Architecture in Paris. Before founding his own firm in 1984, he worked for Luxembourg's Services des Sites et Monuments Nationaux. Clemes' Atelier d'Architecture et de Design now employs 55 architects, engineers, technicians and support staff.

Works

His design work has included:

the Banque Générale du Luxembourg building, boulevard Royal, Luxembourg City;
Centre de conférences provisoire (temporary conference centre) at the Foire Internationale de Luxembourg winning the Prix luxembourgeois d'architecture in 2004.
Centre Hospitalier Emile Mayrisch, Esch-sur-Alzette.
The Belval railway station, Luxembourg.
Melia Hotel, Luxembourg.
Kinneksbond Cultural Centre, Mamer.

Clemes was also associated with the design of the futuristic waterpark Les Thermes in Bertrange, Luxembourg, and is involved in a town planning project for Differdange, Luxembourg.

References

Luxembourgian architects
1957 births
People from Luxembourg City
Living people
École Spéciale d'Architecture alumni
Miami University alumni